Bone Daddy (also known as Palmer's Bones and L'affaire Palmer) is a 1998 Canadian-American crime thriller film directed by Mario Azzopardi and starring Rutger Hauer and Barbara Williams.  The film has become a cult classic due to the graphic bone removal scenes.

Premise
Doctor Palmer, a former pathologist, wrote a fictional book based on his real cases. In the book, the madman gets caught, but in reality he is still uncaught. After the book is released, Palmer's editor is kidnapped. Palmer soon is sent a present containing a page of his book, and a bone from his editor. Together with the police, Palmer tries to find his editor, who might still be alive. In addition, his own son becomes one of the main suspects.

Cast 
 Rutger Hauer as Palmer
 Barbara Williams as Sharon
 R. H. Thomson as Stone
 Joseph Kell as Peter
 Robin Gammell as Cobb
 Blu Mankuma as Trent
 Mimi Kuzyk as Kim
  Wayne Best as Rodman
 Daniel Kash as Rocky
 Peter Keleghan as Tarnower
 Kirsten Bishop as Leslie
 Kyra Azzopardi as Mark
  Michael Caruana as Hurwitz
 Dean McDermott as Mort Jr.

References

External links 

 
 Bone Daddy Overview at The New York Times

American crime thriller films
Canadian crime thriller films
English-language Canadian films
1998 crime thriller films
1998 films
1990s English-language films
Films directed by Mario Philip Azzopardi
1990s American films
1990s Canadian films